Kite is the common name for certain birds of prey in the family Accipitridae, particularly in subfamilies Milvinae, Elaninae, and Perninae. The term is derived from Old English cȳta (“kite; bittern”),<ref>A Concise Anglo-Saxon Dictionary%20(%E2%80%9Ckite%3B%20bittern&f=false</ref> from the Proto-Indo-European root *gū- , "screech."Flaksman, Maria. (2016). "Iconic Words in Proto-Germanic." Anglistics of the XXI century, vol. 2. Phonosemantics : in commemoration of Professor Dr. Stanislav Voronin's 80th anniversary. volume 2. 39-51. 

Some authors use the terms "hovering kite" and "soaring kite" to distinguish between Elanus and the milvine kites, respectively.   The group may also be differentiated by size, referring to milvine kites as "large kites", and elanine kites as "small kites". 

Species
 Subfamily Elaninae
 Genus Elanus Black-winged kite, Elanus caeruleus Black-shouldered kite, Elanus axillaris White-tailed kite, Elanus leucurus Letter-winged kite, Elanus scriptus Genus Chelictinia Scissor-tailed kite, Chelictinia riocourii Genus Gampsonyx Pearl kite, Gampsonyx swainsonii Subfamily Harpiinae
 Genus Machaerhamphus Bat hawk, Machaerhamphus alcinus – traditionally Elaninae or Falconinae
 Subfamily Elaninae or Perninae
 Genus Elanoides – often classified in Perninae
 Swallow-tailed kite, Elanoides forficatus Subfamily Milvinae
 Genus Haliastur Whistling kite, Haliastur sphenurus Brahminy kite, Haliastur indus Genus Milvus Red kite, Milvus milvus Cape Verde kite, Milvus (milvus) fasciicauda – extinct (2000)
 Black kite, Milvus migrans Black-eared kite, Milvus (migrans) lineatus Yellow-billed kite, Milvus (migrans) aegyptius Subfamily Milvinae or Buteoninae, or tribe Harpagini
 Genus Harpagus Double-toothed kite, Harpagus bidentatus Rufous-thighed kite, Harpagus diodon Subfamily Milvinae or Buteoninae
 Genus Ictinia Mississippi kite, Ictinia mississippiensis Plumbeous kite, Ictinia plumbea Genus Rostrhamus Snail kite, Rostrhamus sociabilis Genus Helicolestes Slender-billed kite, Helicolestes hamatus – formerly in Rostrhamus Subfamily Milvinae or Perninae
 Genus Lophoictinia Square-tailed kite, Lophoictinia isura Genus Hamirostra Black-breasted buzzard, Hamirostra melanosternonA few of the traditional Perninae are also called kites.

 Genus Leptodon Grey-headed kite, Leptodon cayanensis White-collared kite, Leptodon forbesi Genus Chondrohierax Hook-billed kite, Chondrohierax uncinatus Cuban kite, Chondrohierax wilsoniiTaxonomy and systematics

19th century

In 1824, Vigors proposed five divisions or stirpes of the family Falconidae: Aquilina (eagles), Accipitrina (hawks), Falconina (falcons), Buteonina (buzzards) and Milvina (kites, containing two genera Elanus and Milvus).  He characterized the kites as having weaker bill and feebler talons than the buzzards, tail more or less forked, and wings longer than the tail.

In Elanus, he grouped the black-winged kite (now several Elanus spp.), scissor-tailed kite (now Chelictinia), and swallow-tailed kite (now Elanoides).  These species all have pointed wings with the second primary the longest.  The pattern of scales on the legs (acrotarsi) is reticulated, and the toes are separated.  But Vigors noted that only the black-winged kite had rounded undersides on the nails of its talons, a trait found in the osprey but not in any other raptors, and thus suggested a separation of Elanus into two sections.  A year later, he established a separate genus Nauclerus for the scissor- and swallow-tailed kites.Milvus contained the familiar red and black kites.  The fourth primary feather is the longest, leg scales are scutellated, and the exterior toe is united to the middle toe by a membrane.

Vigors placed Ictinia – "the Milan Cresserelle of M. Vieillot" and "the Mississippi Kite of Mr. Wilson" – into Buteonina.  Though noting that "the wings are of considerable length, extending far beyond the tail, a character which has induced M. Vieillot and others to place this bird near the Kites", he wrote that the strong affinity in characteristics and manners warranted it to be placed closer to the falcons.

20th century

Swann's 1922 synopsis grouped all the kites together with the "cuckoo-falcons" and honey buzzards into a large Milvinæ subfamily.  His order was: Elanoides, Chelictinia, Milvus, Lophoictinia, Rostrhamus, Helicolestes, Chondrohierax, Odontriorchis, Gypoictinia (=Hamirostra), Elanus, Gampsonyx, Ictinia, Harpagus, Baza, Aviceda, Henicopernis, Machærhamphus, Pernis.  

In contrast, Peters grouped the large kites into subfamily Milvinae and most small kites into Elaninae, with a few small kites joining the honey-buzzards and bazas in Perninae. His arrangement of kite genera was as follows:

Elaninae: Elanus, Chelictinia, Machaerhamphus. 
Perninae: Elanoïdes, (Aviceda, Henicopernis, Pernis, Odontotriorchis), Chondrohierax. 
Milvinae: Harpagus, Ictinia, Rostrhamus, Helicolestes, Milvus, Lophoictinia, Hamirostra, Haliastur.
Polyhieracinae: GampsonyxThe pearl kite Gampsonyx had variously been placed with the accipiters, forest-falcons, or elanine kites.  It was not until the 1960s that a similar molt schedule established its affinity to Elanus.

21st century

By 2015, genetic research showed that many of the kite genera are related to honey-buzzards, and that the tiny bat hawk (Machaerhamphus  or Macheirhamphus) is actually related to the huge harpy eagles.  Several of the large kites are related more closely to the Buteo hawks (buzzards) than to the group of "true" kites and sea-eagles.

Boyd places the "true" milvine kites (Milvus and Haliastur) with the sea-eagles in tribe Milvini within Buteoninae. This results in the following arrangement (genera in parentheses are not generally called kites):
Elaninae: Gampsonyx, Chelictinia, Elanus.
Perninae: Chondrohierax, Leptodon, Elanoides, (Pernis), Hamirostra, Lophoictinia, (Henicopernis).
Buteoninae
Harpagini: Harpagus.
Milvini: Haliastur, Milvus, (Haliaeetus, Icthyophaga).
Buteonini: many genera, including the kites Ictinia, Rostrhamus, and Helicolestes.  Ictinia is near-basal, after the Old-World genus Butastur.  Rostrhamus and Helicolestes form a clade with the black-collared hawk (Busarellus) and the crane hawk (Geranospiza'').

As early as 1882, Anton Reichenow had also placed Section Milvinæ alongside Section Buteoninæ in Subfamily Buteoninæ.

In mythology

Isis is said in ancient Egyptian mythology to have taken the form of a kite in various situations in order to resurrect the dead.

It also figures in several fables by Aesop which underline its character as a predator: The Sick Kite, The Kite and the Doves and a variant of The Crow and the Snake.

References

External links 
Weekly Radio Segments from With the Wild Things: Kites
Kite videos on the Internet Bird Collection

 
Bird common names
Birds of prey

Vultures